Cherniakhiv is an urban-type settlement in Zhytomyr Raion, Zhytomyr Oblast, Ukraine. It is the administrative center of Cherniakhiv Raion. Population:  In 2001, population was 10,416.

Notable personalities 
 Nikifor Chernigovsky - Polish soldier and Russian adventurer.

References

Urban-type settlements in Zhytomyr Raion
Volhynian Governorate